Mark Mackay can refer to:

 Mark Mackay (footballer) (born 1978), Aruban footballer
 Mark MacKay (born 1964), German ice hockey player